Martin Walter Haefner (born 1954) is a Swiss billionaire, the son of Walter Haefner.

Early life
He is the son of Walter Haefner. When his father died in 2012, aged 101, he was the world's oldest billionaire, and had a net worth of US$4.3 billion.

Career
Haefner studied mathematics at the ETH Zurich. For many years he worked as a high-school teacher. At the age of 50, his father put him in charge of AMAG, the family-owned importer of Volkswagen, Audi, Skoda and SEAT cars into Switzerland. After the death of their father, Haefner and his sister Eva Maria Bucher-Haefner divided 2018 their heritage such that Martin Haefner became sole owner of AMAG. Through the sale of their participation in the US software company CA Technologies, funds were available for additional investments. Haefner became the main shareholder of Schmolz + Bickenbach, a steel producer with factories in several countries.

Personal life
He is married and lives in Horw, Canton of Lucerne.

References

1954 births
Living people
Swiss billionaires